Assistant Commissioner of Police of the Metropolis, usually just Assistant Commissioner (AC), is the third highest rank in London's Metropolitan Police, ranking below Deputy Commissioner and above Deputy Assistant Commissioner. There are usually four officers in the rank. However, as of March 2022 there are five due to the continuing secondment of Assistant Commissioner Rob Beckley to Operation Resolve, the criminal investigation into the Hillsborough Disaster. There have also at times been five in the past.

From 1 September 2016 the salary is £198,823 (plus £2,373 allowance). This does not include use of private car and pension contributions. This makes them the equal fifth highest paid police officers in the United Kingdom, behind the Commissioner, the Deputy Commissioner, the Chief Constable of Police Scotland, and the Chief Constable of the Police Service of Northern Ireland, and alongside the chief constables of West Midlands and Greater Manchester.

19th century
The rank of assistant commissioner was introduced by the Police Act 1856, which abolished the two joint commissioners and established a single Commissioner (Sir Richard Mayne) assisted by two assistant commissioners. The Assistant Commissioner (Administrative) was in charge of administration and discipline. The Assistant Commissioner (Executive) was in charge of executive business, supplies and buildings. The first two men to fill these posts were Lieutenant-Colonel Douglas Labalmondière and Captain William C. Harris respectively.

Like the Commissioner, the assistant commissioners were sworn in as justices of the peace, although they could not try criminal cases. This continued until 1973. Like the Commissioner, the assistant commissioners were mainly appointed from outside the police until well into the 20th century, although career police officers could and sometimes did rise to the rank.

In 1878, Howard Vincent was appointed Director of Criminal Intelligence, a post that had equal rank to the assistant commissioners, but not the title. On his resignation in 1884, his post was replaced by a third assistant commissioner, the Assistant Commissioner (Crime).

Lettered departments
In 1909, Commissioner Sir Edward Henry, realising that the assistant commissioners' workload was becoming too great, appointed a fourth assistant commissioner, who took over some of the duties of the Assistant Commissioner (Executive). The four became known as Assistant Commissioners "A", "B", "C" and "L", heading departments with the same letter designations. Assistant Commissioner "A" effectively acted as Deputy Commissioner until 1931, when a separate Deputy Commissioner was appointed. From 1922 until 1931, Assistant Commissioner "A" was generally known as the Deputy Commissioner.

After World War I, Assistant Commissioner "B" became responsible solely for traffic and lost property, with his other former duties divided between Assistant Commissioners "A" and "L". Assistant Commissioner "L" was responsible for "L" (Legal) Department until its reorganisation in 1931. After 1931, he was renamed Assistant Commissioner "D" and became responsible for policy and planning.

By the end of World War II, Assistant Commissioner "A" (Operations and Administration) was responsible for all uniformed police, including specialist units, except traffic police, which were under Assistant Commissioner "B" (Traffic). Assistant Commissioner "C" (Crime) headed the Criminal Investigation Department (CID), and Assistant Commissioner "D" (Personnel and Training) was responsible for recruitment, training, welfare, communications and police dogs. In 1970, Commissioner Sir John Waldron designated Assistant Commissioner "D" as the senior Assistant Commissioner. As policing became more technical, Assistant Commissioner "B" also became responsible for technical support.

Reorganisation in the 1980s and 1990s
In 1985, Commissioner Sir Kenneth Newman finally abolished the system of lettered departments. He redesignated the four Assistant Commissioners as:

Assistant Commissioner Territorial Operations (ACTO), in charge of all uniformed and CID units based on the divisions.
Assistant Commissioner Specialist Operations (ACSO), in charge of all specialised and centralised uniformed and CID units.
Assistant Commissioner Personnel and Training (ACPT), in charge of all personnel issues, including recruitment, training and welfare.
Assistant Commissioner Management Support (ACMS), in charge of strategic planning, management services, public relations and a number of other miscellaneous departments.

In 1992, with increasing focus on the Met's image and quality of service, Commissioner Sir Peter Imbert redesignated the ACMS as Assistant Commissioner Inspection and Review (ACIR), in charge of collecting performance data from across the Metropolitan Police District.

In 1995, Commissioner Sir Paul Condon introduced the widest-ranging reorganisation when he increased the number of assistant commissioners to six. The previous eight Areas, each commanded by a deputy assistant commissioner (DAC), were reduced to five, each commanded by an assistant commissioner, designated AC 1 to 5. Each assistant commissioner also had force-wide responsibility for a 'portfolio' (such as crime or traffic), setting force policy and managing related headquarters branches. ACSO remained outside the area system and continued to manage the Specialist Operations units.

Organisation restructuring in the 21st century
In 2000, the system changed again, with policing restructured around the boroughs and the areas being abolished. The six assistant commissioners were reduced to four again. With the creation of the Specialist Crime Directorate under its own assistant commissioner in 2002, there were five assistant commissioners, although this was once again reduced to four in 2008. In 2011, the number was briefly increased to five again, then reduced to four once more. The posts have held varying designations since 2000, with the ACSO being the only post to have remained since the initial reorganisation in 1985.

The assistant commissioners are considered to hold equal rank to the chief constables of other British police forces and wear the same rank insignia: a crown over crossed tipstaves in a wreath.

Assistant commissioners from 1856 to 1985
These positions existed concurrently.

Assistant Commissioners "A"
Lieutenant-Colonel Douglas Labalmondière, 1856–1884
Sir Alexander Carmichael Bruce, 1884–1914
Frank Elliott, 1914–1918
Brigadier-General William Horwood, 1918–1920
Sir James Olive, 1920–1925
Vice-Admiral Sir Charles Royds, 1926–1931
Sir Trevor Bigham, 1931
Lieutenant-Colonel David Allan, 1931
Brigadier James Whitehead, 1933–1938
Lieutenant-Colonel John Carter, 1938–1940
John Nott-Bower, 1940–1945
Major John Ferguson, 1945–1946
Major Sir Philip Margetson, 1946–1957
Alexander Robertson, 1957–1958
Douglas Webb, 1958–1961
Lieutenant-Colonel Ranulph Bacon, 1961–1963
Sir John Waldron, 1963–1966
John Hill, 1966–1968
Andrew Way, 1968–1969
James Starritt, 1970–1972
John Mastel, 1972–1976
Wilford Gibson, 1977–1984
Geoffrey Dear, 1984–1985

Assistant Commissioners "B"
Captain William C. Harris, 1856–1881
Lieutenant-Colonel Richard Pearson, 1881–1890
Sir Charles Howard, 1890–1902
Major Sir Frederick Wodehouse, 1902–1918
Frank Elliott, 1918–1931
Sir Alker Tripp, 1932–1947
Sir Henry Dalton, 1947–1956
Joseph Simpson, 1956–1957
Douglas Webb, 1957–1958
John Waldron, 1958–1963
Andrew Way, 1963–1968
Robert Mark, 1968
James Starritt, 1968–1970
Colin Woods, 1970–1972
Henry Hunt, 1972–1974
Patrick Kavanagh, 1974–1977
Jock Wilson, 1977–1982
John Dellow, 1982–1984
Colin Sutton, 1984–1985

Assistant Commissioners "C"
James Monro, 1884–1888
Sir Robert Anderson, 1888–1901
Edward Henry, 1901–1903
Sir Melville Macnaghten, 1903–1913
Sir Basil Thomson, 1913–1921
Major-General Sir Wyndham Childs, 1921–1928
Sir Trevor Bigham, 1928–1931
Sir Norman Kendal, 1931–1945
Ronald Howe, 1945–1953
Sir Joe Jackson, 1953–1963
Lieutenant-Colonel Sir Ranulph Bacon, 1963–1966
Peter Brodie, 1966–1972
Colin Woods, 1972–1975
Jock Wilson, 1975–1977
Gilbert Kelland, 1977–1984
John Dellow, 1984–1985

Assistant Commissioners "L"
Frederick Bullock, 1909–1914
Trevor Bigham, 1914–1928
Norman Kendal, 1928–1931

Assistant Commissioners "D"
Major Maurice Tomlin, 1932–1933
Lieutenant-Colonel Sir Percy Laurie, 1933–1936
Sir George Abbiss, 1936–1946
Major Philip Margetson, 1946
Colonel Arthur Young, 1947–1950
Brigadier John Rymer-Jones, 1950–1959
Tom Mahir, 1959–1967
Robert Mark, 1967–1968
John Hill, 1968–1972
John Mastel, 1972
John Alderson, 1973
Henry Hunt, 1974–1978
John Gerrard, 1978–1981
Geoffrey Dear, 1981–1984
Geoffrey McLean, 1984–1985

Assistant commissioners from 1985 onwards
These were not all concurrently existing positions.

Areas

Assistant Commissioner Central Area (1)
Tony Speed, 1994–1999

Assistant Commissioners North-West Area (2)
Bill Skitt, 1994–1997
Anderson Dunn, 1997–2000

Assistant Commissioners North-East Area (3)
Anderson Dunn, 1994–1997
Paul Manning, 1997–2000

Assistant Commissioner South-East Area (4)
Ian Johnston, 1994–2000

Assistant Commissioners South-West Area (5)
Paul Manning, 1994–1997
Denis O'Connor, 1997–2000

Portfolios

Assistant Commissioners Specialist Operations
John Dellow, 1985–1987
Hugh Annesley, 1987–1989
John Smith, 1989–1990
William Taylor, 1990–1994
Sir David Veness, 1994–2005
Andy Hayman, 2005–2007
Bob Quick, 2008–2009
John Yates, 2009–2011
Cressida Dick, 2011–2014
Mark Rowley, 2014–2018
Neil Basu, 2018–2021
Matt Jukes, 2021–

Assistant Commissioners Territorial Operations
Geoffrey McLean, 1985–1990
Robert Hunt, 1991–1995

Assistant Commissioners Management Support
Colin Sutton, 1985–1987
John Smith, 1987–1989
Peter Winship, 1989–1992

Assistant Commissioners Personnel and Training
Hugh Annesley, 1985–1987
Colin Sutton, 1987–1988
Wyn Jones, 1989–1993

Assistant Commissioner Inspection and Review
Peter Winship, 1992–1995

Assistant Commissioner Strategic Development
Anderson Dunn, 2000–2001

Assistant Commissioners Territorial Policing
Ian Johnston, 2000–2001
Michael J. Todd, 2001–2003
Tim Godwin, 2003–2009
Rose Fitzpatrick, 2009 (temporary)
Ian McPherson, 2009–2011
Simon Byrne, 2011–2014
Helen King, 2014–2016
Martin Hewitt, 2016–2018

Assistant Commissioners Policy, Review and Standards
Michael J. Todd, 2000–2001
Tarique Ghaffur, 2001–2002

Assistant Commissioner Human Resources
Bernard Hogan-Howe, 2001–2004

Assistant Commissioners Specialist Crime
Tarique Ghaffur, 2002–2006
Stephen House, 2006–2007
John Yates, 2007–2009
Cressida Dick, 2009–2011

Assistant Commissioners Central Operations
Stephen House, 2005–2006
Tarique Ghaffur, 2006–2008
Chris Allison, 2008–2010
Lynne Owens, 2010–2011

Assistant Commissioner Service Improvement
Alan Brown, 2005–2006

Assistant Commissioner Professional Standards and Intelligence
John Yates, 2006–2007

Assistant Commissioners Operational Services
John Yates, 2007
Alf Hitchcock, 2007–2008 (acting)

Assistant Commissioner Olympics and Paralympics
Chris Allison, 2011–2013

Assistant Commissioners Central Operations and Specialist Crime
Lynne Owens, 2011
Mark Rowley, 2011–2014

Assistant Commissioner Operation Resolve
Jon Stoddart, 2012–2016
Rob Beckley, 2016–

Assistant Commissioner Professionalism
Martin Hewitt, 2014–2016
Helen King, 2016–2017
Fiona Taylor, 2017 (temporary)
Helen Ball, 2017–2021
Amanda Pearson, 2021–2022 (temporary)
Barbara Gray, 2022–

Assistant Commissioners Specialist Crime and Operations
Cressida Dick, 2014–2015
Pat Gallan, 2015–2018

Assistant Commissioners Frontline Policing
Martin Hewitt, 2018
Mark Simmons, 2018–2020
Nick Ephgrave, 2020–2022
Louisa Rolfe, 2022–

Assistant Commissioners Met Operations
Sir Stephen House, 2018
Nick Ephgrave, 2018–2020
Louisa Rolfe, 2020–2022
Matt Twist, 2022– (temporary)

Assistant Commissioner COVID-19 response
Mark Simmons, 2020

Assistant Commissioner Transformation
Matt Jukes, 2020–2021

Footnotes

Ranks in the Metropolitan Police